Allocasuarina tessellata is a shrub or tree of the genus Allocasuarina native to a small areas in the Mid West, Wheatbelt and Goldfields-Esperance regions of Western Australia.

It is found in loamy or sandy soils.

References

External links
  Occurrence data for Allocasuarina tessellata from The Australasian Virtual Herbarium

tessellata
Rosids of Western Australia
Fagales of Australia